is a Japanese politician, actor and singer. He was elected as the Governor of Chiba Prefecture in March 2009 to April 2021 and re-elected to a second term in March 2013. He previously served one term in the House of Councillors of the National Diet, representing the Tokyo at-large district from 1992 until 1998, and two terms in the House of Representatives from 1998 until 2003, representing the Tokyo 4th district.

Morita retirement with Governor on April 4, 2021.

Film 
Castle of Sand (1972) : Hiroshi Yoshimura
Mount Hakkoda (1977) : Mikami
The War in Space (1977) : Miyoshi
The Fall of Ako Castle (1978) : Jujiro Hazama
Sanada Yukimura no Bōryaku (1979) : Juzo Kakei
Virus (1980) : Ryûji Sanazawa

Television 
 Orewa otokoda! (1971)
Hissatsu Karakurinin (1976)

Notes

External links 
 
 Kensaku Morita OfficialWeb（Japanese）
 Governor's page（Prefecture Chiba official website）

1949 births
Japanese actor-politicians
Japanese male singers
Living people
Members of the House of Councillors (Japan)
Members of the House of Representatives (Japan)
Male actors from Tokyo
Politicians from Tokyo
Singers from Tokyo
Governors of Chiba Prefecture
Male critics of feminism